Saipirú Airport  is a public use airstrip serving the natural gas pipeline facility at Saipirú in the Santa Cruz Department of Bolivia.

See also

Transport in Bolivia
List of airports in Bolivia

References

External links 
OpenStreetMap - Saipirú

Airports in Santa Cruz Department (Bolivia)